Polychrus marmoratus or many-colored bush anole  is a species of bush anole. It is also commonly referred to as the monkey lizard due to its slow movement. The lizard has many predators, including spiders and primates.

Description 
Polychrus marmoratus weighs 101.19 grams. The lizard is 30 to 50 centimeters long. It has a blunt snout with large and smooth scales on the dorsal surface of the head. The scales on the flank and skin are smaller. The lizard is commonly brown or olive-grey. Blue or black spots may be present on the head. The neck is bluish, while the ventral region is whitish. Five or six "V-shaped bands" are present on the back.

The lizard hunts insects and spiders using an ambush method. It will also feed on flowers and seeds. The lizard inhabits semi-deciduous forests.

Distribution 
The species is present in Guyana, Brazil, Peru, and Ecuador. The species has also been sighted in Trinidad and Tobago, Venezuela, and Florida.

References 

Polychrotidae
Reptiles described in 1758
Taxa named by Carl Linnaeus
Lizards of South America
Lizards of North America
Lizards of the Caribbean
Reptiles of Peru
Reptiles of Brazil
Reptiles of Ecuador
Reptiles of Guyana
Reptiles of the United States
Reptiles of Trinidad and Tobago
Reptiles of Venezuela